The High Commission of South Africa may refer to one of two South African embassies:

 High Commission of South Africa, London in the United Kingdom
 High Commission of South Africa, Ottawa in Canada